Ted Panken is an American jazz journalist who has written for Down Beat, Jazziz, and Jazz Times.  

From 1985 to 2008, he broadcast jazz and creative music on radio station WKCR. He has written more than 500 liner notes and has contributed to the New York Daily News and jazz.com. Panken is a member of the nominating committee for the Jazz Journalists Association's Critics' Choice Awards.

In 2006 he was given the Lifetime Achievement in Jazz Journalism award by the Jazz Journalists Association.

References

Living people
Year of birth missing (living people)
American music critics
Jazz writers